Yockey is an unincorporated community in Marion Township, Lawrence County, Indiana.

Geography

References

Unincorporated communities in Lawrence County, Indiana
Unincorporated communities in Indiana